Blends & Remixes Of Someone Else is Ira Losco's first remix album. It was released in January 2005. Produced by Bridge Productions, Blends & Remixes Of Someone Else is a collection of tracks from her previous album Someone Else remixed by top local DJs. 
"Local famous DJs which contributed to this album are REN-D, Simon Pisani, DJ Ruby, Owen Jay, Miss Roberta, Toby, Hooligan and others".

Track listing

References

External links
 Official Ira Losco Website
 Official Myspace page

Ira Losco albums
2005 remix albums